Provesano  is a frazione of the comune of San Giorgio della Richinvelda, in the province of Pordenone in Friuli-Venezia Giulia, Italy. The name Provesano is of Roman origin; it consists of Probus or (Publicius) and the suffix –anu, indicating the landed property.

History
There were much people living in Provesano in Roman and pre-Roman times. 
From the 11th century to 1871 Provesano belonged to the comune of Spilimbergo.In 1871 the people of Provesano wanted to join the comune of San Giorgio della Richinvelda.

Notable people 
 Pim Fortuyn, Dutch politician, sociologist, author and professor, assassinated during the Dutch general election of 2002, buried in the cemetery of the frazione Provesano.

Bibliography
 
 A.A.V.V. Foto d’archivio. San Giorgio della Richinvelda, 1985.
 
 A.A.V.V. Cultura artigiana del Comune di San Giorgio della Richinvelda, San Giorgio della Richinvelda, 1987.
 A.A.V.V. San Giorgio della Richinvelda. Un Comune e la sua gente. Storia-arte-cultura, San Giorgio della Richinvelda, 1993.
 
 A.A.V.V. Alla scoperta del comune di San Giorgio della Richinvelda. Pro Loco San Giorgio della Richinvelda, 2014.
 
 Luigi Luchini, Memorie storiche e cronache recenti. San Giorgio della Richinvelda e frazioni del comune, Portogruaro, 1968.
 
 Luigi Luchini, La pieve di San Giorgio della Richinvelda, San Giorgio della Richinvelda, 1980.
 
 Giorgio Moro – Maurizio Roman, La Grande Guerra e il Territorio di San Giorgio della Richinvelda, San Giorgio della Richinvelda, 2013.
 
 Giorgio Moro – Maurizio Roman, La Seconda Guerra mondiale e il Territorio di San Giorgio della Richinvelda, San Giorgio della Richinvelda, 2015.

Frazioni of the Province of Pordenone